The coat of arms of the West Pomeranian Voivodeship, Poland depicts a red griffin with yellow (golden) beak and claws on the white (silver) background. The coat of arms was created by Jerzy Bąk and adopted in 2000.

Design 
The coat of arms consists of a red griffin with yellow (golden) beak and claws standing in the combat position, within the white (silver) Iberian style escutcheon.

The white colour is described in the hex triplet system as #FFFFFF, the red colour as #D22730, and the yellow as #F7D417.

History 
The griffin is a traditional symbol of the West Pomerania, used since 12th century. Between 12th and 13th century, the griffin become the symbol of the House of Griffin, that ruled in that area. Subsequently, the red griffin on the white background had become the symbol of the Duchy of the Pomerania-Stettin. In the 1730s, that design had become the symbol of the entire West Pomerania.

The coat of arms the West Pomeranian Voivodeship, was designed by Jerzy Bąk. The design was based on the red griffin present on the banner used by the forces of Casimir V, duke of Pomerania-Stettin, during the Battle of Grunwald in 1410.

On 11 August 2000, the project had been approved by the Heraldic Commission, and on 23 October 2000, adopted by the West Pomeranian Voivodeship Sejmik. The coat of arms is additionally present on the flag of the West Pomeranian Voivodeship.

See also 
 Flag of the West Pomeranian Voivodeship
 Coat of arms of Mecklenburg-Vorpommern

References 

West Pomeranian
West Pomeranian Voivodeship
West Pomeranian Voivodeship
West Pomeranian Voivodeship
2000 establishments in Poland